Tazeh Qaleh (also Romanized as Tāzeh Qal‘eh) is a village in Akhtachi Rural District, in the Central District of Bukan County, West Azerbaijan Province, Iran. At the 2006 census, its population was 333, in 71 families.

References 

Populated places in Bukan County